Gemini (stylized in promotional material as GEMINI) is the fourth studio album by Japanese visual kei rock band Alice Nine. The album was officially released on February 9, 2011.

Gemini was released in two formats: a limited edition with an exclusive DVD and a regular edition with an exclusive bonus track. The DVD included with the limited edition of the album features a music video for "Gemini 0: Eternal" and a making-of documentary for the music video. The album was preceded by two singles: "Senkō", released in August 2010, and "Stargazer:", released in November 2010.

The title of the album refers to a theme of "duality", particularly opposing elements such as light versus shadow and birth versus death. This theme is most prevalent in the trilogy of songs after which the album is named.

Track listing
All lyrics written by Shou. All tracks were produced by Hajime Okano, with the exception of "Senkō", which was produced by Alice Nine.

 Standard edition

 Limited edition

Personnel
 Shou - vocals
 Hiroto - electric guitar, acoustic guitar
 Tora - electric guitar, acoustic guitar
 Saga - bass guitar, electric guitar, synthesizer, programming
 Nao - drums
 Tucky - engineer
 Kenjiro Harigai - art direction, design
 Hiroki Hayashi - design
 Hitoshi Hiruma - engineer
 Keita Joko - engineer
 Tomoka Konagaya - artwork coordination
 Ai Maehara - artwork management
 Susumu Miyawaki - photography
 Mizuo Miura - engineer
 Koji Morimoto - engineer
 Hajime Okano - arrangement, keyboard, synthesizer, tambourine
 Yuya Saito - engineer
 Yasuaki "V" Shindo - engineer
 Shinpei Yamada - engineer

Reception
Gemini peaked at number three on the Oricon Weekly Albums Chart and stayed on the charts for three weeks. The album is their highest Oricon ranking release to date.

References

External links
 Official PS Company website
 Official Tokuma Japan Communications website

2011 albums
Alice Nine albums